Andrew Kuper  is a South African-Australian serial entrepreneur and investor in emerging markets. As a pioneer of Profit with Purpose business, Kuper has been credited with the birth of a virtuous new asset class. He is the founder and CEO of LeapFrog Investments, a specialist investor in emerging markets, investing in financial services and healthcare. Former United States President Bill Clinton announced the launch of the company in 2008, recognising it for opening new frontiers in alternative investing. LeapFrog has since attracted $2 billion USD from global investors. In 2017, Fortune ranked LeapFrog Investments as one of the top 5 Companies to Change the World, alongside Apple and Novartis. Originally from South Africa, Kuper now resides in Sydney, Australia and spends time in LeapFrog's offices in Europe, Africa and Asia.

Career
Kuper was born in South Africa and brought up on a farm outside of Johannesburg. He is the son of anti-apartheid campaigners. He began investing at the age of 10 and took on his first clients at age 13. He attended the University of Witwatersrand in Johannesburg  followed by Harvard University where he won the Henry Fellowship. He later graduated from Cambridge University with a PhD in social science and political science supervised by Nobel laureate Amartya Sen.

In 2004, Kuper was appointed to managing director at Ashoka, an organisation that finances thousands of social entrepreneurs. Among other roles, he ran the Global Academy for Social Entrepreneurship, working with Muhammad Yunus of Grameen Bank and Fazle Abed of BRAC.

In 2007, Kuper founded LeapFrog Investments. Using a distinctive 'profit with a purpose' approach, LeapFrog invests in companies that provide access to financial services and healthcare to underserved people in emerging markets. Since its establishment, as chief executive, Kuper has helped attract over $2 billion from global investors including Temasek, American International Group Inc. (AIG), Swiss Re AG, AXA SA and Prudential Financial. The companies in which the firm has invested have had an annual growth rate of more than 27% and reach 342 million people in 35 countries.

In 2018, Kuper was awarded the John S. Bickley Founders Award Gold Medal for Excellence by the International Insurance Society recognised for his pioneering work in profit with purpose investment.

Earlier in his career, Kuper received the Ernst & Young Entrepreneur of the Year Award. He was also named a Young Global Leader by the World Economic Forum, and received the Young Presidents' Organization's Social Engagement Network Award. Kuper has delivered keynote addresses to the Clinton Global Initiative, Geneva Association CEO Meetings, the IFC/Emerging Markets Private Equity Association (EMPEA) summits, and the EY World Entrepreneur of the Year event. He is a board member of GPCA.

In 2022, Kuper was appointed Officer of the Order of Australia in the 2022 Queen's Birthday Honours for "distinguished service to the impact investing industry, to global business leadership, and to financial inclusion".

Kuper is the editor and lead author of one book on governance and globalisation, Global Responsibilities (Routledge, 2005) and the author of another, Democracy Beyond Borders (Oxford, 2004).

Bibliography
Kuper, A. (2004). Democracy beyond borders: Justice and representation in global institutions. Oxford: Oxford University Press.
Kuper, A. (2005). Global responsibilities: Who must deliver on human rights? New York: Routledge.

References

External links
LeapFrog Investments Official Site
President Bill Clinton Honors LeapFrog Investments

Alumni of the University of Cambridge
Australian chief executives
Harvard University alumni
Living people
Microinsurance
Officers of the Order of Australia
University of the Witwatersrand alumni
Year of birth missing (living people)